Tarragona may refer to:

Places
Tarragona, a municipality of province of Tarragona, Catalonia, Spain
Province of Tarragona, a province of Catalonia
Tarragona, Davao Oriental,  municipality in the province of Davao Oriental, Philippines

Sport
Gimnàstic de Tarragona, a sports club based in Tarragona, Catalonia, Spain
CB Tarragona, a professional Basketball team based in Tarragona, Catalonia
Open Tarragona Costa Daurada, a tennis tournament held in Tarragona, Catalonia
Nou Estadi de Tarragona, a multi-purpose stadium in Tarragona, Catalonia

Other uses
Tarragona (DO), a Spanish Denominación de Origen (DO) for wines located in the province of Tarragona, Catalonia, Spain
Tarragona (Barcelona Metro), a station in the Barcelona Metro network, served by L3 (green line), located under Tarragona Street, Barcelona, Catalonia
Tarragona (Spanish Congress Electoral District), the electoral district covering the province for elections to the Spanish Parliament
Tarragona Tower, a structure composed of a tower and arch built of coquina stone in Daytona Beach, Florida, United States
Tarragona Amphitheatre, a Roman amphitheatre in the city of Tarragona, Catalonia
Roman Catholic Archdiocese of Tarragona, a Roman Catholic ecclesiastical territory located in the province of Tarragona, Catalonia
Tarragona Cathedral, a Roman Catholic church in Tarragona, Catalonia
Himerius of Tarragona, a bishop of Tarragona during the 4th century
Tarragona International Dixieland Festival, was started in Tarragona, Catalonia
Wall of Tarragona, a wall located in Tarragona, Catalonia
Council of Tarragona, was held by Archbishop John of Tarragona, Catalonia
Camp de Tarragona, a natural and historical region of Catalonia

See also
Siege of Tarragona (disambiguation)